Grüner See (literally "Green Lake") may refer to:
Grüner See (Styria), near Tragöß, Austria
Grüner See (Lower Saxony)
Grüner See (Hundelshausen)

See also
Grünsee (disambiguation)
Green Lake (disambiguation)